Iris Faircloth Blitch (April 25, 1912 – August 19, 1993) was a United States representative from Georgia. She was the fourth woman to represent Georgia in the Congress, and the first to win a regularly scheduled general election. Blitch was a vocal advocate both for women's rights and racial segregation.

Early life 
Blitch was born near Vidalia, Georgia and attended the University of Georgia (UGA) in Athens in 1929. She also attended South Georgia College in Douglas in 1949. Blitch worked with her husband in managing their farm as well as cattle, timber, naval stores, fertilizer, and pharmacy businesses in Homerville, Georgia.

Political career

State legislature
In 1946, Blitch was elected to the Georgia Senate; she was subsequently elected to the Georgia House of Representatives in 1948 but lost her reelection bid to that office in 1950. She won election to the state Senate again in 1952 and remained in that position through December 31, 1954. From 1948 through 1954, Blitch was Georgia's Democratic Party national committee member.

Tenure in Congress 
Running a successful campaign for Georgia's 8th congressional district in the United States House of Representatives as a Democrat, Blitch served in the 84th United States Congress.

A staunch segregationist, in 1956, Blitch was among the 101 Southern politicians to sign the Southern Manifesto.  She won re-election to three additional terms in that seat before choosing not to seek reelection in 1962 due to severe arthritis.  In 1964, Mrs. Blitch left the Democratic Party and endorsed Republican presidential nominee Barry Goldwater.

Within days of her 1954 election, Blitch appeared on the American television show What's My Line.

Later life
After her political service, Blitch resided on St. Simons Island, Georgia, until 1988, when she moved to San Diego, California, to be closer to her daughter.  She died there on August 19, 1993, and was buried in Pine Forest Cemetery in Homerville, Georgia.

See also
 Women in the United States House of Representatives

Note

References

 NY Times Obituary
 OCLC's Authority records for 20060201

1912 births
1993 deaths
Georgia (U.S. state) state senators
Members of the Georgia House of Representatives
University of Georgia alumni
American segregationists
Female members of the United States House of Representatives
Women state legislators in Georgia (U.S. state)
People from Toombs County, Georgia
Women in Georgia (U.S. state) politics
Democratic Party members of the United States House of Representatives from Georgia (U.S. state)
Georgia (U.S. state) Republicans
People from St. Simons, Georgia
People from Clinch County, Georgia
20th-century American politicians
20th-century American women politicians
California Republicans